Arnold Alas (known as Arnold Hoffart until 1939; 1 July 1911 – 20 April 1990) was an Estonian landscape architect and artist.

Alas was born in Tapa, and died, aged 78, in Tallinn. He is most known for his work on the World War II memorial ensemble in Tallinn, which is now widely referred to as the Bronze Soldier and includes a two-meter bronze statue (by Enn Roos) of a soldier in a Soviet uniform and an accompanying monumental stone structure. The memorial was relocated amid controversy in April 2007 to the Defence Forces Cemetery in Tallinn, Estonia.

References 

Alas, Arnold - haljastusarhitekt ja maalikunstnik by Arthur Ruusmaa.
Pronkssõduri müür on värav surnuteriiki by Tõnu Virvet.

1911 births
1990 deaths
People from Tapa, Estonia
People from the Governorate of Estonia
20th-century Estonian male artists
Soviet architects
20th-century Estonian architects
Soviet artists